The Northwestern Wildcats baseball team was a baseball team that represented Northwestern University in the 2022 NCAA Division I baseball season. The Wildcats were members of the Big Ten Conference and played their home games at Rocky Miller Park in Evanston, Illinois. They were led by interim head coach Josh Reynolds.

Previous season
The Wildcats finished the 2021 NCAA Division I baseball season 15–21 overall (15–21 conference) and tenth place in conference standings, as the season was limited to only conference games for all Big Ten teams due to the COVID-19 pandemic.

Preseason
On May 31, 2021, Spencer Allen resigned as the head coach of Northwestern. That same day, Wildcats pitching coach, Josh Reynolds was named the interim head coach for the 2022 season. On August 2, 2021, Reynolds added his former head coach, Brad Hill to his coaching staff. On August 19, 2021, Reynolds finished his coaching staff, naming Jimmy Frankos as his volunteer assistant.

Roster

Schedule

! style="" | Regular Season
|- valign="top"

|- align="center" bgcolor="#ffcccc"
| 1 || February 18 || at UAB || Jerry D. Young Memorial Field • Birmingham, Alabama || 7–8 || C. Myers (1–0) || Moe (0–1) || None || 372 || 0–1 || –
|- align="center" bgcolor="#ffcccc"
| 2 || February 19 || at UAB || Jerry D. Young Memorial Field • Birmingham, Alabama || 1–4 || O'Clair (1–0) || Dyke (0–1) || Greene (1) || 295 || 0–2 || –
|- align="center" bgcolor="#ffcccc"
| 3 || February 19 || at UAB || Jerry D. Young Memorial Field • Birmingham, Alabama || 4–10 || Ballard (1–0) || Smith (0–1) || None || 295 || 0–3 || –
|- align="center" bgcolor="#ffcccc"
| 4 || February 20 || at UAB || Jerry D. Young Memorial Field • Birmingham, Alabama || 5–11 || Walton (1–0) || Pate (0–1) || None || 233 || 0–4 || –
|- align="center" bgcolor="#ffcccc"
| 5 || February 25 || at  || Stephen Schott Stadium • Santa Clara, California || 4–12 || Kitchen (1–1) || Doherty (1–1) || None || 426 || 0–5 || –
|- align="center" bgcolor="#ccffcc"
| 6 || February 26 || at Santa Clara || Stephen Schott Stadium • Santa Clara, California || 10–0 || Sullivan (1–0) || Hales (0–1) || Moe (1) || 371 || 1–5 || –
|- align="center" bgcolor="#ffcccc"
| 7 || February 26 || at Santa Clara || Stephen Schott Stadium • Santa Clara, California || 3–10 || Feikes (2–0) || Farinelli (0–1) || Sando (1) || 371 || 1–6 || –
|- align="center" bgcolor="#ffcccc"
| 8 || February 27 || at Santa Clara || Stephen Schott Stadium • Santa Clara, California || 2–7 || Reelfs (1–1) || Pate (0–2) || None || 308 || 1–7 || –
|-

|- align="center" bgcolor="#ffcccc"
| 9 || March 4 || at  || UC Baseball Stadium • Cincinnati, Ohio || 4–5 || Weaver (2–1) || Doherty (0–2) || None || 850 || 1–8 || –
|- align="center" bgcolor="#ccffcc"
| 10 || March 4 || at Cincinnati || UC Baseball Stadium • Cincinnati, Ohio || 10–8 || Utagawa (1–0) || Bergman (0–1) || None || 850 || 2–8 || –
|- align="center" bgcolor="#ffcccc"
| 11 || March 5 || at Cincinnati || UC Baseball Stadium • Cincinnati, Ohio || 2–4 || Steckline (1–0) || Farinelli (0–2) || None || 2,042 || 2–9 || –
|- align="center" bgcolor="#ffcccc"
| 12 || March 5 || at Cincinnati || UC Baseball Stadium • Cincinnati, Ohio || 5–16 || Linn (1–0) || Pate (0–3) || None || 1.634 || 2–10 || –
|- align="center" bgcolor="#dddddd"
| – || March 11 || St. Thomas (MN) || Rocky Miller Park • Evanston, Illinois ||colspan=7| Game cancelled
|- align="center" bgcolor="#dddddd"
| – || March 12 || St. Thomas (MN) || Rocky Miller Park • Evanston, Illinois ||colspan=7| Game cancelled
|- align="center" bgcolor="#ccffcc"
| 13 || March 13 || St. Thomas (MN) || Rocky Miller Park • Evanston, Illinois || 9–0 || Sullivan (2–0) || Laubscher (0–3) || None || 245 || 3–10 || –
|- align="center" bgcolor="#ccffcc"
| 14 || March 13 || St. Thomas (MN) || Rocky Miller Park • Evanston, Illinois || 3–2 || Utagawa (2–0) || Schewe (0–1) || None || 290 || 4–10 || –
|- align="center" bgcolor="#dddddd"
| – || March 19 ||  || Rocky Miller Park • Evanston, Illinois ||colspan=7| Game cancelled
|- align="center" bgcolor="#ccffcc"
| 15 || March 20 || Evansville || Rocky Miller Park • Evanston, Illinois || 10–4 || Sullivan (3–0) || Gray (3–2) || None || 450 || 5–10 || –
|- align="center" bgcolor="#ccffcc"
| 16 || March 20 || Evansville || Rocky Miller Park • Evanston, Illinois || 8–1 || Farinelli (1–2) || Smith (2–1) || None || 410 || 6–10 || –
|- align="center" bgcolor="#dddddd"
| – || March 22 || at  || Frank Eck Stadium • Notre Dame, Indiana ||colspan=7| Game cancelled
|- align="center" bgcolor="#ccffcc"
| 17 || March 25 || vs  || Bulldog Park • Indianapolis, Indiana || 10–4 || Sullivan (4–0) || Hansell (4–1) || None || 431 || 7–10 || –
|- align="center" bgcolor="#ccffcc"
| 18 || March 25 || at  || Bulldog Park • Indianapolis, Indiana || 13–3 || Farinelli (2–2) || Bosecker (0–3) || None || 203 || 8–10 || –
|- align="center" bgcolor="#ccffcc"
| 19 || March 26 || vs Southern Illinois || Bulldog Park • Indianapolis, Indiana || 15–6 || Moe (1–1) || Steidl (0–2) || None || 731 || 9–10 || –
|- align="center" bgcolor="#ffcccc"
| 20 || March 27 || at Butler|| Bulldog Park • Indianapolis, Indiana || 10–11 || Drees (1–0) || Comstock (0–1) || None || 245 || 9–11 || –
|-

|- align="center" bgcolor="#ffcccc"
| 21 || April 1 || at Indiana || Bart Kaufman Field • Bloomington, Indiana || 4–5 || Holderfield (1–1) || Moe (1–2) || Tucker (1) || 1,454 || 9–12 || 0–1
|- align="center" bgcolor="#ccffcc"
| 22 || April 2 || at Indiana || Bart Kaufman Field • Bloomington, Indiana || 7–6 || Farinelli (3–2) || Brehmer (3–2) || Beshears (1) || 1,768 || 10–12 || 1–1
|- align="center" bgcolor="#ccffcc"
| 23 || April 3 || at Indiana || Bart Kaufman Field • Bloomington, Indiana || 13–6 || Sauser (1–0) || Stahl (0–1) || None || 1,980 || 11–12 || 2–1
|- align="center" bgcolor="#ccffcc"
| 24 || April 5 ||  || Rocky Miller Park • Evanston, Illinois || 13–3 || Scharm (1–0) || Jeff (0–1) || None || 159 || 12–12 || 2–1
|- align="center" bgcolor="#ccffcc"
| 25 || April 9 ||  || Rocky Miller Park • Evanston, Illinois || 5–4 || Moe (2–2) || Miller (1–2) || None || 278 || 13–12 || 3–1
|- align="center" bgcolor="#ffcccc"
| 26 || April 9 || Penn State || Rocky Miller Park • Evanston, Illinois || 1–4 || Tulio (2–1) || Farinelli (3–3) || Luensmann (1) || 278 || 13–13 || 3–2
|- align="center" bgcolor="#ccffcc"
| 27 || April 10 || Penn State || Rocky Miller Park • Evanston, Illinois || 5–2 || Beshears (1–0) || Mellott (1–4) || None || 375 || 14–13 || 4–2
|- align="center" bgcolor="#ccffcc"
| 28 || April 12 ||  || Rocky Miller Park • Evanston, Illinois || 14–4 || Hanks (1–3) || Winston (0–1) || None || 133 || 15–13 || 4–2
|- align="center" bgcolor="#ffcccc"
| 29 || April 15 || at  || Illinois Field • Champaign, Illinois || 6–7 || Rybarczyk (2–1) || Moe (2–3) || None || 929 || 15–14 || 4–3
|- align="center" bgcolor="#ffcccc"
| 30 || April 16 || at Illinois || Illinois Field • Champaign, Illinois || 6–11 || Crowder (2–1) || Farinelli (3–4) || None || 1,781 || 15–15 || 4–4
|- align="center" bgcolor="#ffcccc"
| 31 || April 17 || at Illinois || Illinois Field • Champaign, Illinois || 0–3 || Gowens (4–1) || Comstock (0–2) || Vera (1) || 574 || 15–16 || 4–5
|- align="center" bgcolor="#ccffcc"
| 32 || April 19 ||  || Rocky Miller Park • Evanston, Illinois || 8–5 || Hanks (2–0) || Holmes (1–2) || Beshears (2) || 131 || 16–16 || 4–5
|- align="center" bgcolor="#ccffcc"
| 33 || April 22 ||  || Rocky Miller Park • Evanston, Illinois || 14–2 || Sullivan (5–0) || Powers (2–5) || None || 553 || 17–16 || 5–5
|- align="center" bgcolor="#ccffcc"
| 34 || April 23 || Michigan State || Rocky Miller Park • Evanston, Illinois || 4–1 || Farinelli (4–4) || Tomasic (2–2) || Beshears (3) || 657 || 18–16 || 6–5
|- align="center" bgcolor="#ffcccc"
| 35 || April 24 || Michigan State || Rocky Miller Park • Evanston, Illinois || 7–11 || Bischoff (2–1) || Comstock (0–3) || Carson (1) || 293 || 18–17 || 6–6
|- align="center" bgcolor="#ccffcc"
| 36 || April 26 ||  || Rocky Miller Park • Evanston, Illinois || 8–0 || Doherty (1–2) || DeYoung (0–2) || None || 93 || 19–17 || 6–6
|- align="center" bgcolor="#ffcccc"
| 37 || April 29 || at No. 23 Maryland || Bob "Turtle" Smith Stadium • College Park, Maryland || 0–13 || Ramsey (8–0) || Sullivan (5–1) || None || 1,270 || 19–18 || 6–7
|- align="center" bgcolor="#ccffcc"
| 38 || April 30 || at No. 23 Maryland || Bob "Turtle" Smith Stadium • College Park, Maryland || 7–4 || Moe (3–3) || Falco (4–1) || Doherty (1) || 2,576 || 20–18 || 7–7
|-

|- align="center" bgcolor="#ffcccc"
| 39 || May 1 || at No. 23 Maryland || Bob "Turtle" Smith Stadium • College Park, Maryland || 5–10 || Falco (5–1) || Hanks (2–1) || None || 568 || 20–19 || 7–8
|- align="center" bgcolor="#ffcccc"
| 40 || May 4 || at UIC || Les Miller Field at Curtis Granderson Stadium • Chicago, Illinois || 0–13 || Torres (1–2) || Utagawa (2–1) || None || 145 || 20–20 || 7–8
|- align="center" bgcolor="#ffcccc"
| 41 || May 7 ||  || Rocky Miller Park • Evanston, Illinois || 6–14 || Haberthier (1–4) || Moe (3–4) || None || 543 || 20–21 || 7–9
|- align="center" bgcolor="#ffcccc"
| 42 || May 7 || Ohio State || Rocky Miller Park • Evanston, Illinois || 9–25 || Coupet (3–5) || Farinelli (4–5) || None || 543 || 20–22 || 7–10
|- align="center" bgcolor="#ffcccc"
| 43 || May 8 || Ohio State || Rocky Miller Park • Evanston, Illinois || 5–6 || Baird (2–0) || Smith (0–2) || Hammerberg (5) || 526 || 20–23 || 7–11
|- align="center" bgcolor="#ccffcc"
| 44 || May 10 || at Milwaukee || Franklin Field • Franklin, Wisconsin || 21–8 || Hanks (3–1) || Neu (1–1) || None || 398 || 21–23 || 7–11
|- align="center" bgcolor="#ffcccc"
| 45 || May 13 || Purdue || Rocky Miller Park • Evanston, Illinois || 8–14 || Stephen (3–3) || Sullivan (5–2) || None || 673 || 21–24 || 7–12
|- align="center" bgcolor="#ccffcc"
| 46 || May 14 || Purdue || Rocky Miller Park • Evanston, Illinois || 11–1 || Farinelli (5–5) || Wendell (5–3) || None || 609 || 22–24 || 8–12
|- align="center" bgcolor="#ffcccc"
| 47 || May 15 || Purdue || Rocky Miller Park • Evanston, Illinois || 2–7 || Wansing (4–4) || Comstock (4–4) || Weins (3) || 608 || 22–25 || 8–13
|- align="center" bgcolor="#ffcccc"
| 48 || May 17 || No. 14  || Rocky Miller Park • Evanston, Illinois || 4–14 || Birkholz (1–0) || Utagawa (2–2) || None || 447 || 22–26 || 8–13
|- align="center" bgcolor="#ffcccc"
| 49 || May 19 || at  || Siebert Field • Minneapolis, Minnesota || 14–15 || Skoro (1–0) || Beshears (1–1) || None || 405 || 22–27 || 8–14
|- align="center" bgcolor="#ccffcc"
| 50 || May 20 || at Minnesota || Siebert Field • Minneapolis, Minnesota || 11–9 || Farinelli (6–5) || Massey (2–8) || Hanks (1) || 485 || 23–27 || 9–14
|- align="center" bgcolor="#ccffcc"
| 51 || May 21 || at Minnesota || Siebert Field • Minneapolis, Minnesota || 8–5 || Sauser (2–0) || Skoro (1–1) || None || 736 || 24–27 || 10–14
|-

Awards

Big Ten Conference Players of the Week

Conference awards

References

Northwestern
Northwestern Wildcats baseball seasons
Northwestern